Bakar Mirtskhulava (born 24 May 1992) is a Georgian footballer who plays as a defender for Torpedo Kutaisi.

Career

As a youth player, Mirtskhulava joined the youth academy of Georgian side Torpedo (Kutaisi).

In 2008, he joined the youth academy of Benfica, the most successful club in Portugal. After that, he almost signed for Portuguese team Marítimo.

Before the second half of the 2012–13 season, Mirtskhulava signed for Zimbru in Moldova, where he made 7 appearances and scored 0 goals. On 3 March 2013, he debuted for Zimbru during a 0-2 loss to Nistru.

In 2013, Mirtskhulava signed for Georgian outfit Dinamo Zugdidi.

Honours
Torpedo Kutaisi
Georgian Cup: 2016, 2022

References

External links

 
 

Expatriate footballers in Portugal
Living people
Association football defenders
1992 births
Erovnuli Liga players
Moldovan Super Liga players
FC Torpedo Kutaisi players
FC Dila Gori players
FC Chikhura Sachkhere players
FC Shukura Kobuleti players
FC Zugdidi players
FC Zimbru Chișinău players
Expatriate sportspeople from Georgia (country) in Moldova
Expatriate sportspeople from Georgia (country) in Portugal
Expatriate footballers from Georgia (country)
Footballers from Georgia (country)
Expatriate footballers in Moldova